Motorpsycho or Motor Psycho is a 1965 film by Russ Meyer. Made just before Meyer's better-known Faster, Pussycat! Kill! Kill! (1965), the film explores similar themes of sex and violence, but focuses on a male motorcycle gang, unlike the female gang of go-go dancers featured in Faster, Pussycat!. Motorpsycho is also notable for containing one of the first portrayals of a disturbed Vietnam veteran character in film.

Plot 
The story involves a veterinarian whose wife is raped by a motorcycle gang led by a sadistic Vietnam veteran. After the gang kills an old man, his wife teams up with the veterinarian to hunt down the gang.

Cast
Haji as Ruby Bonner
Alex Rocco as Cory Maddox
Stephen Oliver as Brahmin
Holle K. Winters as Gail Maddox
Joseph Cellini as Dante
Thomas Scott as Slick
Coleman Francis as Harry Bonner
Sharon Lee as Jessica Fannin
Steve Masters as Frank
Arshalouis Aivazian as Wife
E. E. Meyer as Sheriff
George Costello as Doctor

Production
Russ Meyer was having trouble with the censor board because of his films so decided to make a more action oriented movie. The working title of the film was Rio Vengeance.

Haji was a dancer at a nightclub when she heard about auditions for one film. Meyer cast her in one role but liked her so much he promoted her to one of the leads. She later recalled:
Russ worked with a five-man crew, and he took us all into the desert with snakes, lizards, and all kinds of danger. He thought if you were a guy, you could live in a tent out in the desert, but the ladies he treated better. We lived in a trailer. When you shoot in the desert, you come back with dirt in your eyelashes and hair. Our shower was a big barrel with a cork in it, set up on four sticks. You pulled the cork out, got wet, stuck the cork back in, soaped up, pulled the cork back out, rinsed off, and that was it!
Two actors were injured while filming a scene involving motorbikes and wound up in hospital.

Reception
According to Meyer, the film went "through the roof [commercially]. So I said, `Well, let's do one with three bad girls'." This led to Faster Pussycat! Kill! Kill!.

The Los Angeles Times said it and Faster Pussycat "pack as much sex and violence as possible on the screen without bringing in the police. In fact, they're so ludicrously erotic and sadistic they can be taken as parodies of the entire genre of exploitation pictures."

Legacy

Norwegian band Motorpsycho picked their name after watching this movie in a Russ Meyer triple feature. There was already a band named after Mudhoney and a band named after Faster, Pussycat! Kill! Kill! – the other two films on the triple feature – so they used "Motorpsycho".

There are references to Faster, Pussycat! Kill! Kill! in the song "Thunder Kiss '65" by White Zombie. The song also uses the phrase "motorpsycho", a popular pun on the word motorcycle that predates the movie (Peter Phillips' 1961/62 painting "Motorpsycho/Tiger" being one notable example).

See also
List of American films of 1965
Outlaw biker film
List of biker films
Exploitation film

References

External links
 
 
Motorpsycho at TCMDB
Motorpsycho at Letterboxd

1965 films
Outlaw biker films
Films directed by Russ Meyer
American rape and revenge films
Films with screenplays by Russ Meyer
1960s action films
Films scored by Paul Sawtell
1960s English-language films
1960s American films